MuxCo is an operator of digital radio in the United Kingdom.  It is, in joint ventures, the licensee for local DAB ensembles in various parts of England and Wales. It is owned by Arqiva, Bauer Radio and Folder Media (owners of Fun Kids). It acquired several licences since 2008, and launched service in 2013.

"MuxCo Suffolk Ltd" is a joint venture between MuxCo, Nation Broadcasting and launched on 30 September 2016.

The first launch, of the multiplex based in Wrexham and Cheshire, was planned for November 2012  but was pushed back to the beginning of 2013.  Test transmissions from Moel-y-Parc began on Monday 11 March 2013 and from Wrexham Rhos on Tuesday 12 March 2013, with full transmissions from these two sites scheduled to commence on 18 March 2013.  It was announced on 9 March 2013 that the third transmission site, St John's Beacon, would be added at a later date the multiplex was renamed Wrexham Chester and Liverpool
Subsequently they launched Mid and West Wales, Somerset, Hereford and Worcestershire, Gloucestershire, North Yorkshire, Suffolk, Lincolnshire and Humberside. Surrey and South London.

Licenses

References

External links
MuxCo official website
Folder Media official website

Digital radio